BluesWay Records was an American subsidiary label of ABC-Paramount Records, begun by Bob Thiele in 1966. Artists such as John Lee Hooker, Jimmy Reed, Jimmy Rushing, Otis Spann, and T-Bone Walker were among those who signed for the label. BluesWay released B. B. King's 1969 Live and Well and Completely Well albums, the latter containing his hit "The Thrill is Gone".  The label also released the James Gang's first album, 1969's Yer' Album.

BluesWay ceased operations in 1970, with Hooker, King and James Gang being transferred to the parent ABC Records label. The imprint was briefly revived in 1973–74. The BluesWay masters, along with the rest of ABC Records' assets, were sold to MCA Records in 1978.

Discography
BluesWay Records released albums from 1967 until 1974.

See also
 List of record labels

References

Defunct record labels of the United States
Blues record labels